Xylan 1,4-beta-xylosidase (xylobiase, beta-xylosidase, exo-1,4-beta-xylosidase, beta-D-xylopyranosidase, exo-1,4-xylosidase, exo-1,4-beta-D-xylosidase, 1,4-beta-D-xylan xylohydrolase) is an enzyme with systematic name 4-beta-D-xylan xylohydrolase. This enzyme catalyses the following chemical reaction

 Hydrolysis of (1->4)-beta-D-xylans, to remove successive D-xylose residues from the non-reducing termini

This enzyme also hydrolyses xylobiose.

References

External links 

EC 3.2.1